Michelle Yeraldin Romero Castillo (born 12 June 1997) is a Venezuelan footballer who plays as a defender for the Spanish Primera Federación club Sporting de Gijón and the Venezuela women's national team.

International career
Romero represented Venezuela at the 2014 South American U-20 Women's Championship.

References

External links 
Michelle Romero at BDFútbol

1997 births
Living people
Sportspeople from Maracaibo
Venezuelan women's footballers
Women's association football defenders
Asociación Civil Deportivo Lara players
Zulia F.C. players
Deportivo de La Coruña (women) players
Sporting de Gijón (women) players
Primera División (women) players
Segunda Federación (women) players
Venezuela women's international footballers
Competitors at the 2014 Central American and Caribbean Games
Venezuelan expatriate women's footballers
Venezuelan expatriate sportspeople in Spain
Expatriate women's footballers in Spain